This is a list of lesbian, gay, bisexual or transgender-related films released in 1976. It contains theatrically released films that deal with important gay, lesbian, bisexual, or transgender characters or issues and may have same-sex romance or relationships as a plot device.

Films

LGBT
1976 in LGBT history
1976
1976